Guido Castelli (born 30 November 1965 in Siena) is an Italian lawyer and politician.

Former member of the Italian Social Movement and National Alliance, he has been a member of the centre-right party Forza Italia since 2013. He was elected Mayor of Ascoli Piceno on 23 June 2009, and re-elected for a second term on 28 May 2014.

See also
2014 Italian local elections
List of mayors of Ascoli Piceno

References

External links
 

1965 births
Living people
University of Macerata alumni
20th-century Italian lawyers
21st-century Italian lawyers
Mayors of Ascoli Piceno
People from Ascoli Piceno
Italian Social Movement politicians
National Alliance (Italy) politicians
The People of Freedom politicians
Forza Italia (2013) politicians
Brothers of Italy politicians
20th-century Italian politicians
21st-century Italian politicians